Lodoicea, commonly known as the sea coconut, coco de mer, or double coconut, is a monotypic genus in the palm family. The sole species, Lodoicea maldivica, is endemic to the islands of Praslin and Curieuse in the Seychelles. It has the biggest seed in a plant. It formerly also was found on the small islets of St Pierre, Chauve-Souris, and Ile Ronde (Round Island), all located near Praslin, but had become extinct there for a time until recently reintroduced.

Taxonomy
The name of the genus Lodoicea is given by Philibert Commerson, it may be derived from Lodoicus, a Latinised form of Louis (typically Ludovicus), in honour of King Louis XV of France. Other sources say that Lodoicea is from Laodice, the daughter of Priam and Hecuba.

Lodoicea belongs to the Coryphoideae subfamily and tribe Borasseae. Borasseae is represented by four genera in Madagascar and one in Seychelles out of the seven worldwide. They are distributed on the coastlands surrounding the Indian ocean and the existing islands within. Borassus, the genus closest to Lodoicea, has about five species in the "old world," one species in Africa, one in India, South-East Asia and Malaysia, one in New Guinea and two species in Madagascar.

Description

The tree generally grows to 25–34 m tall. The leaves are fan-shaped, 7–10 m long and 4.5 m wide with a 4 m petiole in mature plants. It is dioecious, with separate male and female plants. The male flowers are arranged in a catkin-like inflorescence up to 2 m (6.5 ft) long  which continues to produce pollen over a ten-year period; one of the longest-living inflorescences known. The mature fruit is 40–50 cm in diameter and weighs 15–30 kg, and contains the largest seed in the plant kingdom. The fruit, which requires 6–7 years to mature and a further two years to germinate, is sometimes also referred to as the sea coconut, love nut, double coconut, coco fesse, or Seychelles nut.

While the functional characteristics of Lodoicea are similar to other trees of monodominant forests in the humid tropics, its unique features include a huge seed, effective funnelling mechanism and diverse community of closely associated animals. These attributes suggest a long evolutionary history under relatively stable conditions. Of the six monospecific endemic palms in Seychelles, Lodoicea is the "only true case of island gigantism among Seychelles flowering plants, a unique feature of Seychelles vegetation". It holds eleven botanical records: 

 It produces the largest wild fruit so far recorded, weighing up to 36 kg (79.2 lbs), and perhaps as much as 99 pounds (45 kilograms). (although domesticated pumpkins and watermelons can be much heavier)
 The fruit is composed of three carpels which are the largest of any flowering plant (although the carpels of Entada spp. are longer).
These fruit are the slowest to mature, requiring 8 to 10 years.
 The mature seeds weighing up to 17.6 kg ( 29 lbs) are the world's heaviest 
 The seed upon germinating, produces the longest known cotyledon, up to four meters (13 feet). and on occasion as long as ten meters (33 feet).
It is the slowest growing of all large trees,  although some small to medium-sized desert trees are slower. At the Peradenaya Royal Botanic Gardens, it grew an average of 1.29 inches (33 millimeters) per year over a period of 140 years.
 The female flowers are the largest of any palm, up to four inches (ten centimeters) in diameter. 
 The male catkins, up to two meters (6.5 feet) in length, are the longest known.
 The sepals, which grow with the fruit, are the largest known; up to 9 inches (23 centimeters) long by six inches (15 centimeters) wide. 
 The leaves of Lodoicea have the longest lifespan of any monocot, nine years to develop in the terminal spike, and then nine more years as a fully functioning leaf. However adult Lodoicea can have as many as twenty leaves with a potential lifespan of 24 years. 
 Finally, Lodoicea is the most efficient plant known at recovering nutrients from moribund leaves.

Of the six endemic palms it is the only dioecious species, with male and female flowers on different plants.

Habit
Lodoicea is robust, solitary, up to 30 m tall with an erect, spineless, stem which is ringed with leaf scars (Calstrom, unpublished). This bowl is pierced with hundreds of small oval holes about the size of a thimble with hollow tubes corresponding on the outside through which the roots penetrate the ground on all sides, never, however, becoming attached to the bowl; they are partially elastic, affording an almost imperceptible but very necessary "play" to the parent stem when struggling against the force of violent gales.

Leaves
The crown is a rather dense head of foliage with leaves that are stiff, palmate up to 10 m in diameter and petioles of two to four metres in length. The leaf is plicate at the base, cut one third or more into segments 4–10 cm broad with bifid end which are often drooping. A triangular cleft develops at the petiole base. The palm leaves form a huge funnel that intercepts particulate material, especially pollen, which is flushed to the base of the trunk when it rains. In this way, Lodoicea improves its nutrient supply and that of its dispersal-limited offspring.

Flowers

The clusters of staminate flowers are arranged spirally and are flanked by very tough leathery bracts. Each has a small bracteole, three sepals forming a cylindrical tube, and a three-lobed corolla. There are 17 to 22 stamens. The pistillate flowers are solitary and borne at the angles of the rachis and are partially sunken in it in the form of a cup. They are ovoid with three petals as well as three sepals. It has been suggested that they may be pollinated by animals such as the endemic lizards that inhabit the forest where they occur. Pollination by wind and rain are also thought to be important. Only when Lodoicea begins to produce flowers, which can vary from 11 years to 45 or more, is it possible to visually determine the sex of the plant. The nectar and pollen are also food for several endemic animals e.g. bright green geckos (Phelsuma sp.), white slugs (Vaginula seychellensis) and insects.

Inflorescence

Inflorescences are interfoliar, lacking a covering spathe and shorter than the leaves. The staminate inflorescence is catkin-like, one to two metres long by about three inches (8 centimeters) in width and produces pollen over a period of 8 to ten years. These catkins are  generally terminal and solitary, but sometimes two or three catkins may be present. The pistillate inflorescences are also one to two metres long unbranched and the flowers are borne on a zig-zagging rachilla.

Fruit

The fruit is bilobed, flattened, 40 to 50 cm long ovoid and pointed, and contains usually one but occasionally two to four seeds. The epicarp is smooth and the mesocarp is fibrous. The endosperm is thick, relatively hard, hollow and homogenous. The embryo sits in the sinus between the two lobes. During germination a tubular cotyledonary petiole develops that connects the young plant to the seed. The length of the tube is reported to reach about four metres. In the Vallée de Mai the tube may be up to 10 m long.

Lodoicea was once believed to be a sea-bean or drift seed, a seed evolved to be dispersed by the sea. However, it is now known that the viable nut is too dense to float, and only rotted out nuts can be found on the sea surface, thus explaining why the trees are limited in range to just two islands.

Habitat
Lodoicea inhabit rainforests where there are deep, well-drained soils and open exposed slopes; although growth is reduced on such eroded soils.

History and mythology

Lodoicea was formerly known as the Maldive coconut. Its scientific name, Lodoicea maldivica, originated before the 18th century when the Seychelles were uninhabited. In centuries past the coconuts that fell from the trees and ended up in the sea would be carried away eastwards by the prevailing sea currents. The nuts can only float after the germination process, when they are hollow. In this way many drifted to the Maldives where they were gathered from the beaches and valued as an important trade and medicinal item.

Until the true source of the nut was discovered in 1768 by Dufresne, it was believed by many to grow on a mythical tree at the bottom of the sea. European nobles in the sixteenth century would often have the shells of these nuts polished and decorated with valuable jewels as collectibles for their private galleries. The coco de mer tree is now a rare and protected species.

Uses

The species is grown as an ornamental tree in many areas in the tropics (including, for example, botanical gardens in Sri Lanka and Thailand), and subsidiary populations have been established on Mahé and Silhouette Islands in the Seychelles to help conserve the species.  The fruit is used in Siddha medicine, Ayurvedic medicine and also in traditional Chinese medicine. In food, it is typically found as flavor enhancers for soups in southern Chinese cuisine, such as that of Guangdong Province.

The seeds of Lodoicea have been highly prized over the centuries; their rarity caused great interest and high prices in royal courts, and the tough outer seed coat has been used to make bowls such as for Sufi/Dervish beggar-alms kashkul bowls and other instruments.

In traditional Chinese medicine, it is used to treat inflammation, nausea and abdominal pain.

Threats
Lodoicea maldivica is officially classified as an endangered species by the International Union for Conservation of Nature (IUCN), with only approximately 8,000 wild mature trees left as of 2019. The history of exploitation continues today, and the collection of nuts has virtually stopped all natural regeneration of populations with the exception of the introduced population on Silhouette. This palm has been lost from the wild from three Seychelles islands within its former range. Habitat loss is one of the major threats to the survival of remaining populations, there have been numerous fires on the islands of Praslin and Curieuse, and only immature trees remain over large parts of these islands.

Conservation
The Seychelles is a World Heritage Site, and a third of the area is now protected. The main populations of Lodoicea are found within the Praslin and Curieuse National Parks, and the trade in nuts is controlled by the Coco-de-mer (Management) Decree of 1995. Firebreaks also exist at key sites in an effort to prevent devastating fires from sweeping through populations. Cultivated palms are grown on a number of other islands and are widely present in botanic gardens; although the collection of seeds in order to recruit these populations may be a further threat to the remaining natural stands. Conservation priorities are the continued protection of populations, enforcement of regulations and effective fire control.

A single cultivated plant at the Botanical Garden of Kolkata, maintained by the Botanical Survey of India, was successfully artificially pollinated in 2015.

Gallery

References

Further reading
Arkive: Lodoicea maldivica
Palm Society of Australia: Lodoicea maldivica description and photo gallery
 Hutchinson, 1959, The Families of Flowering Plants (2nd ed.)
 Fleischer-Dogley, F. (2006). Towards sustainable management of Lodoicea maldivica (Gmelin) Persoon, PhD thesis, University of Reading, UK.

External links

Fruits originating in Africa
Taxa named by Philibert Commerson
Coryphoideae
Trees of Seychelles
Endemic flora of Seychelles
Endangered plants
Decorative fruits and seeds
Monotypic Arecaceae genera
Dioecious plants